Nightfall and Other Stories (1969) is a collection of 20 previously published science fiction short stories by Isaac Asimov. Asimov added a brief introduction to each story, explaining some aspect of the story's history and/or how it came to be written.

Background
In the introduction for the title story, "Nightfall," Asimov explained that although pleased by the praise it had received, he disliked "being told, over and over again" that a story he had written at the age of 21 was his best. Asimov hoped that the collection would prove that "sheer practice [had] made me more proficient, technically, with each year". He chose successful stories not included before in any anthologies edited by Asimov himself.

Contents
  "Nightfall" (first published in September 1941 issue of Astounding Science Fiction), novelette
  "Green Patches" (first published in November 1950 issue of Galaxy Science Fiction as "Misbegotten Missionary")
  "Hostess" (first published in May 1951 issue of Galaxy Science Fiction), novelette
  "Breeds There a Man...?" (first published in June 1951 issue of Astounding Science Fiction), novelette
  "C-Chute" (first published in October 1951 issue of Galaxy Science Fiction), novelette
  "In a Good Cause—" (first published in New Tales of Space and Time, 1951), novelette
  "What If—" (first published in Summer 1952 issue of Fantastic)
  "Sally" (first published in May/June 1953 issue of Fantastic), Robots series
  "Flies" (first published in June 1953 issue of The Magazine of Fantasy & Science Fiction)
  "Nobody Here But—" (first published in Star Science Fiction Stories, 1953)
  "It's Such a Beautiful Day" (first published in Star Science Fiction Stories #3, 1955), novelette
  "Strikebreaker" (first published in January 1957 issue of The Original Science Fiction Stories as "Male Strikebreaker")
  "Insert Knob A in Hole B" (first published in December 1957 issue of The Magazine of Fantasy & Science Fiction)
  "The Up-to-Date Sorcerer" (first published in July 1958 issue of The Magazine of Fantasy & Science Fiction)
  "Unto the Fourth Generation" (first published in April 1959 issue of The Magazine of Fantasy & Science Fiction)
  "What Is This Thing Called Love?" (first published in March 1961 issue of Amazing Stories as "Playboy and the Slime God")
  "The Machine That Won the War" (first published in October 1961 issue of The Magazine of Fantasy & Science Fiction), Multivac series
  "My Son, the Physicist" (first published in February 1962 issue of Scientific American), Multivac series
  "Eyes Do More Than See" (first published in April 1965 issue of The Magazine of Fantasy & Science Fiction)
  "Segregationist" (first published in Book 4 of Abbottempo, 1967), Robots series

References

External links
 
 

1969 short story collections
Science fiction short story collections by Isaac Asimov
Doubleday (publisher) books